The Foundation for MetroWest is a foundation that supports the 33 cities and towns in the MetroWest region of Massachusetts.  It was established in 1995 and as of 2017 had given $14 million to charities in the region, including the Dedham Community House.  It promotes philanthropy, helps donors maximize their impact, and serves as a resource for non-profits in the area, having awarded a total of $300,000 to over 30 of them in December 2016; over its lifetime, it has given over $14 million.  It has $18 million in assets as of 2017.

References

External links
 

Community foundations based in the United States
1995 establishments in Massachusetts
Charities based in Massachusetts
Development charities based in the United States
Philanthropic organizations based in the United States
MetroWest
Natick, Massachusetts